Johan Flodin (born 29 July 1967) is a Swedish rower. He competed in the men's quadruple sculls event at the 1996 Summer Olympics.

References

External links
 

1967 births
Living people
Swedish male rowers
Olympic rowers of Sweden
Rowers at the 1996 Summer Olympics
People from Mölndal
Sportspeople from Västra Götaland County